Dastak is a 1996 Indian Hindi language Psychological thriller film edited directed by Mahesh Bhatt, produced by Mukesh Bhatt with a script written by Vikram Bhatt starring Sushmita Sen in her debut film supported by Mukul Dev with Sharad Kapoor as the villain.

Plot 
Dastak is the story of a mentally unstable genius (Sharad Kapoor) and his obsession for Miss Universe (Sushmita Sen). Sharad is so obsessed with Sushmita that he starts killing her near and dear ones in order to get to her. Here enters ACP Rohit Malhotra (Mukul dev); he meets Sushmita, provides her high-level protection and starts an investigation. Meanwhile, Sushmita faces another incident at an event, Rohit protects her and while calming down her, he calls her "Sush" (Sushmita's nickname which is known to only her parents and best friends) and from there she got to know that Rohit is her childhood friend who adores her since school days. She rejoices and eventually fall in love with him. They start seeing each other; she starts feeling protected and happy, but faces another terrible incident of her best friend's death (murdered by Sharad) which breaks her down. Rohit makes a plan of moving Sushmita to another country for a while and gets the news circulated on media, so that Sharad follow hers and gets in a trap. He joins her in Seychelles along with his trusted junior and is supported by local authorities. Their plan went successful as Sharad showed up and Rohit shoots him while chasing him. As his body is found Sushmita rejoices and celebrates with Rohit. But the happiness is short-lived as Sharad turns out to be alive, he kidnaps Sushmita and takes her to a distant isolated island in the Seychelles. There, he makes her life miserable. Sushmita tries every trick to get out of that hell. But ultimately, everything falls apart. Sushmita tries to reform Sharad by telling him that he should face his problems rather than inflicting the same physical and mental pain (that he went through in his childhood) on other people. But Sharad refuses to listen and amend his ways. She keep on trying to contact Rohit (who was devastated and keeps on searching her madly), plans to run away but fails every time. One day while Sharad was going to city for getting some things she gets a chance of coming out and writes "Help" on the speed boat. Her plan succeeds as Rohit and his subordinates see it and starts chasing him. Sharad saw the word "Help" and gets enraged and shoots down everyone; including Rohit. In the climax, he tries to kill Sushmita as he believes that she betrayed him by contacting Rohit. Sushmita tries to run away but Sharad catches her and when he is about to hit her, Rohit (who survived in the incident) jumps on him and saves Sushmita. Both men fight hard and Rohit gets stabbed by Sharad; while seeing Rohit in this condition Sushmita gets enraged and kills Sharad by hitting him with an axe in self-defense. As she and Rohit return to India, she writes a self-help book and dedicates it to people like Sharad and eventually settles down happily with Rohit.

Cast
Sushmita Sen as Miss Universe Sushmita Sen (Sush)
Mukul Dev as ACP Rohit Malhotra
Sharad Kapoor as Sharad Sule
Manoj Bajpayee as Avinash Banerjee
Vishwajeet Pradhan as Inspector
Tiku Talsania as Professor Fernandes

Soundtrack
The album was composed by Rajesh Roshan with lyrics by Javed Akhtar. All the songs were very popular and singers Kumar Sanu, Udit Narayan, Abhijeet and Alka Yagnik rendered their voices in the album.

External links
 
 https://web.archive.org/web/20111117164303/http://www.bollywoodhungama.com/movies/cast/6132/index.html
 http://ibosnetwork.com/asp/filmbodetails.asp?id=Dastak+(1996)}

1996 films
1990s Hindi-language films
Films directed by Mahesh Bhatt
Films scored by Rajesh Roshan